Lieutenant General Sir Basil Ferguson Burnett Hitchcock,  (3 March 1877 – 23 November 1938) was a British Army officer and first-class cricketer.

Early life
Hitchcock was the elder son of Colonel Burnett Hitchcock, of Weeke Manor, Winchester. Educated at Harrow School, he made two first-class appearances for Hampshire in the 1896 County Championship against Derbyshire and Yorkshire.

Military career
Hitchcock was commissioned into the British Army as a second lieutenant in the Sherwood Foresters on 20 February 1897, and promoted to lieutenant on 12 April 1898. He served in South Africa during the Second Boer War, where he was wounded in early 1900, and was promoted to captain on 12 March 1901. After peacetime service on regular postings, he was deployed with his regiment to France with the British Expeditionary Force and, for rallying the troops at Hancourt, was appointed a Companion of the Distinguished Service Order (DSO). He became Director of Mobilization at the War Office in 1917, Major-General, Administration at Aldershot Command in November 1921 and General Officer Commanding 55th (West Lancashire) Division in July 1926. He went on to be General Officer Commanding Deccan District in India in October 1928 before retiring in December 1930.

Hitchcock died at Westminster, London on 23 November 1938.

Family

Hitchcock married at St Margaret's, Westminster, on 22 October 1902 Anne Austin Robertson-Walker, daughter of J. Robertson-Walker, of Gilgarran, Cumberland. His father-in-law James Robertson played first-class cricket for Middlesex and the Marylebone Cricket Club.

References

1877 births
1938 deaths
Military personnel from Kent
Sportspeople from Chatham, Kent
British Army lieutenant generals
Sherwood Foresters officers
Knights Commander of the Order of the Bath
Companions of the Distinguished Service Order
British Army personnel of World War I
English cricketers
Hampshire cricketers